Thomas Alphonsus O’Callaghan (9 May 1839 – 14 June 1916) was an Irish Roman Catholic bishop who was born and died in Cork.

O'Callaghan was educated at Minerva College, Rome and ordained a Dominican priest in 1863. He received the degree of Doctor of Divinity (DD). He became Prior of St Clement's, Rome in 1881. William Delany, Bishop of Cork preferred successor was the Dean of Cork, Henry Neville but he was viewed unfavourably by Thomas Croke, the Archbishop of Cashel and O'Callaghan was selected. He was consecrated coadjutor bishop of Cork in 1884 before succeeding in 1886. He died in post in 1916.

References

1839 births
1916 deaths
Irish Dominicans
19th-century Roman Catholic bishops in Ireland
Roman Catholic bishops of Cork
20th-century Roman Catholic bishops in Ireland